The 2017 FIBA Americas League was the tenth edition of the top-tier level intercontinental professional club basketball competition in the Americas, the FIBA Americas League. Sixteen teams from across the Americas competed over three rounds, to determine the champion. Brazilian teams were not allowed to compete in the competition, due to the suspension of the Brazilian Basketball Confederation by FIBA, in November 2016.

Guaros de Lara were the defending champions, and they successfully defended their title.

Teams 

The labels in the parentheses show how each team qualified for the place of its starting round (TH: Americas League title holders):
LC: Qualified through a licensed club with a long-term licence
1st, 2nd, etc.: League position after Playoffs
Notes

Group phase

Group A

Group B

Group C

Group D

Semifinals

Group E

Group F

Final 4

Semifinals

Third Place Game

Grand Final

Awards

Quinteto Ideal (Ideal Quintet)

References

External links
FIBA Americas League 
FIBA Americas League 
FIBA Americas  
FIBA Liga Americas Twitter 
LatinBasket.com FIBA Americas League 
Liga de las Américas YouTube Channel 

2016-17
2016–17 in South American basketball
2016–17 in North American basketball